Mount Zheduo belongs to the remnants of the Gongga Mountain in the middle of the Daxue Mountains, towering over the western section of the Sichuan Basin. Mount Zheduo is the watershed between the Dadu River and the Yalong River, and is also the dividing line between Han and Tibetan culture. 

To the west of the Mount Zheduo is the traditional Kham Tibetan area.

References 

Z

Mountain ranges of China
Mountain ranges of Tibet